The Anderson–Hobson Mercantile Store is a historic commercial building at 201 Schuman Street in Foreman, Arkansas.  It is a three-story brick structure with modest Italianate styling, mainly visible in brick corbelling details and segmented-arch window crowns.  It was built c. 1910, as part of a major growth spurt in the county following the arrival of the railroad.  It is one of the few commercial buildings in the county to survive from that period.

The building was listed on the National Register of Historic Places in 1996.

See also
National Register of Historic Places listings in Little River County, Arkansas

References

Commercial buildings on the National Register of Historic Places in Arkansas
Italianate architecture in Arkansas
Commercial buildings completed in 1910
Buildings and structures in Little River County, Arkansas
National Register of Historic Places in Little River County, Arkansas